Lee Tae-sun (born July 16, 1993) is a South Korean actor.

Career 
Lee Tae-sun made his television debut in the 2016 romantic comedy Entertainer where he portrayed a single dad and bassist of a band. The following year, he was cast in Queen of the Ring, which is the third installment of the Three Color Fantasy trilogy, and in the black comedy Prison Playbook, in which he played the younger version of Park Hae-soo's character.

In 2018, Lee joined the cast of OCN's fantasy romantic comedy My First Love. He also took on the role of an elite lawyer in Suits, adapted from the American television series of the same name, and a bar owner as well as the male lead's childhood friend in Gangnam Beauty.

In 2019, Lee appeared in Hotel del Luna, playing IU's character's best friend Yeon-woo in his past life and police officer Park Young-soo in his current life, for which he gained recognition. He was also cast in Beautiful Love, Wonderful Life and starred in the third drama of KBS Drama Special's tenth season, Wreck Car.

In 2020, Lee appeared on tvN's travel show RUN alongside Ji Sung, Kang Ki-young and Hwang Hee, and on SBS's basketball reality show program Handsome Tigers.

Filmography

Television series

Variety show

Awards and nominations

References

External links 
 Lee Tae-sun at Namoo Actors 
 

1993 births
Living people
South Korean male actors
South Korean male television actors
Kyung Hee University alumni